This is a list of seasons completed by the St. Francis Brooklyn Terriers men's college basketball team.
The Terriers have an overall record of 1224–1278.

Season-by-season results

References

 
St. Francis Brooklyn
St. Francis Brooklyn Terriers basketball seasons